Parabryna is a genus of beetle in the family Cerambycidae. Its sole species is Parabryna boudanti. It was described by Hüdepohl in 1995.

References

Pteropliini
Beetles described in 1995